Philotheca buxifolia is a species of flowering plant in the family Rutaceae and is endemic to New South Wales. It is a shrub with more or less oblong leaves and solitary white to pink flowers arranged singly on the ends of branchlets.

Description
The ten stamens are free from each other with a prominent appendage on the anther.

Taxonomy
This species was first formally described in 1809 by James Edward Smith in The Cyclopaedia from specimens "gathered near Port Jackson by Dr White". In 1998, Paul G. Wilson changed the name to Philotheca buxifolius and described three subspecies in the journal Nuytsia. The names of the three subspecies are accepted by the Australian Plant Census:
 Eriostemon buxifolia (Sm.) Paul G.Wilson subsp. buxifolia, commonly known as box-leaf waxflower has leaves are round to broadly elliptical, not folded lengthwise and have a heart-shaped base, and is mainly found in the Sydney area;
 Eriostemon buxifolia subsp. falcata Paul G.Wilson has leaves are round to broadly elliptical, not folded lengthwise and have a heart-shaped base, the subspecies only occurring in the Jervis Bay area; 
 Eriostemon buxifolia subsp. obovata Paul G.Wilson has egg-shaped leaves with the narrower end towards the base and a wedge-shaped base, the subspecies occurring near Gosford and near Ulladulla.

Distribution
Philotheca buxifolia grows in heath on sandstone in coastal areas of New South Wales between Gosford and Ulladulla.

References

buxifolia
Sapindales of Australia
Flora of New South Wales
Taxa named by James Edward Smith
Plants described in 1809